Vittorio Visini (born 25 May 1945) is a retired Italian race walker. He competed in the 20 km and 50 km events at the 1968, 1972 and 1976 Olympics and finished in 6–8th place.

Biography
From 1965 to 1982 Visini took part in 67 international competitions. He won 16 national titles: in the 20 km (1970), 50 km (1970–1975 and 1981), and 5 km indoor (1970–1976 and 1978). In retirement he worked as a racewalking coach.

Achievements

National titles
Visini won 16 national championships at individual senior level.

Italian Athletics Championships
20 km racewalk: 1970 (1)
50 km racewalk: 1970, 1971, 1972, 1973, 1974, 1975, 1981 (7)
Italian Indoor Athletics Championships
2000 m racewalk: 1970, 1971 (2)
3000 m racewalk: 1972, 1973, 1974, 1975, 1976, 1978 (6)

See also
 Italy national athletics team – More caps
Italian Athletics Championships – Multi winners

References

External links
 

1945 births
Living people
Italian male racewalkers
Athletes (track and field) at the 1968 Summer Olympics
Athletes (track and field) at the 1972 Summer Olympics
Athletes (track and field) at the 1976 Summer Olympics
Mediterranean Games gold medalists for Italy
Mediterranean Games silver medalists for Italy
Athletes (track and field) at the 1967 Mediterranean Games
Athletes (track and field) at the 1971 Mediterranean Games
Mediterranean Games medalists in athletics
Athletics competitors of Centro Sportivo Carabinieri
Olympic athletes of Italy
Italian Athletics Championships winners
20th-century Italian people